Urdaneta City University (UCU) is a public university located in Urdaneta City, Pangasinan, Philippines. It was founded in 1966 by Dr. Pedro T. Orata, a world-renowned educator and Ramon Magsaysay awardee, as the Urdaneta Community College (UCC). The school was established to provide education to knowledge-hungry youth and young adults and is considered to be one of the first community college in the Philippines.

History 

UCC was founded in 1966 by Dr. Pedro T. Orata with the support of Mayor Amadeo R. Perez Jr. and the Sangguniang Bayan using the proceeds of the 1966 town fiesta celebration. The college started with a provisional permit to open a two-year General Education course granted by the Secretary of Education and a program for Non-formal Education. Short-term courses in agriculture and retail business for adults were also offered to assist students in enhancing their earning capabilities.

Over the years, the college grew and expanded its educational services by offering new courses, such as Midwifery (1973), Nursing (1975), Computer Education (1990), Graduate School (1995), Commerce and Accountancy (1996), and Caregiver Training Program (2002). Despite its limited resources, UCC proved to be one of the top-performing higher learning institutions in the fields of education, nursing, and midwifery.

In 1998, Urdaneta became a city, and UCC adopted a new name, City College of Urdaneta. In 2006, the institution was declared as Urdaneta City University and was confirmed as such by the Sangguniang Panglunsod of Urdaneta.

Philosophy and Vision 

UCU is committed to providing quality higher education to the students of Urdaneta and its surrounding areas. The university adheres to the principle of education for all and is dedicated to providing equal opportunities and access to higher education to rural students who may not be able to afford collegiate schooling in the cities.

UCU is also committed to character transformation and inculcates in its students the need for not just academic excellence but also character development.

Campus & Facilities 

UCU has its own facilities and has grown steadily over the years. The university continues to attract students from neighboring provinces, such as Abra, Aurora, Isabela, Ilocos, Nueva Vizcaya, Tarlac, Quezon, Mt. Province, and Pampanga.

See also
 local colleges and universities
 Association of Local Colleges and Universities
 Pamantasan
 Alculympics

References

Universities and colleges in Pangasinan
Local colleges and universities in the Philippines
Education in Urdaneta, Pangasinan